Fayek Abdullah Muhhamadi Afandi Mala Rassul or Zewar, (زێوەر in Kurdish), (1875 – 10 November 1948), was a Kurdish poet and writer. Zewar was born in the Kaniskan neighborhood of Sulaimaniya city in Iraq.

References

1875 births
1948 deaths
Iraqi Kurdish people
Kurdish-language writers
Kurdish-language poets
Kurdish poets
People from Sulaymaniyah
Poets from the Ottoman Empire
Iraqi poets